Saint-Raphaël was a French professional cycling team that existed from 1954 to 1964. Its main sponsor was French apéritif brand . From 1959 to 1961, a sister team existed, Rapha–Gitane–Dunlop. One of its champion riders was Jacques Anquetil.

Major results

1955
Stage 5 Paris–Nice, Gilbert Bauvin
Montluçon Criterium, Louis Bergaud
Bonnat Criterium, Claude Colette
Tour du Vaucluse, Russell Mockridge
Stages 1 & 2 Vuelta a España, Gilbert Bauvin
Étoile du Léon, Pierre Barbotin
Saint-Pierre-le-Moûtier Criterium, Claude Colette
Circuit des Deux Ponts, Claude Colette
Stage 4 Critérium du Dauphiné, Maurice Lampre
Stage 9 Tour de France, Raphaël Géminiani
Prix du Chasselas:  Maurice Bertrand
Issoire Criterium:  Louis Bergaud
 Overall Lyon–Montluçon–Lyon, Claude Colette
Stage 1, Maurice Lampre

1956
 National Cyclo-cross Championship, Andrè Dufraisse
 UCI Cyclo-cross World Championship, Andrè Dufraisse
Genève Cyclo-cross, Andrè Dufraisse
Paris Cyclo-cross, Andrè Dufraisse
Critérium International, Roger Hassenforder
Circuit de Drôme–Ardèche, Ferdinand Devèze
Stage 9 Vuelta a España, Hugo Koblet
Stage 10b (TTT) Vuelta a España, Gilbert Bauvin, Jean Dotto, Roger Walkowiak, Maurice Lampre, Louis Bergaud & Gilbert Bauvin
Stage 13b Vuelta a España, Roger Walkowiak
 Overall Tour de Romandie, Pasquale Fornara
Stage 3b, Pasquale Fornara
Bourges, Gilbert Bauvin
Stage 12 Giro d'Italia, Pasquale Fornara
Circuit des Deux Ponts, Louis Caput
Stages 2 & 6 Critérium du Dauphiné, Louis Caput
Stage 7a Critérium du Dauphiné, Pierre Barbotin
Omegna, Pasquale Fornara
 Overall Tour de France, Roger Walkowiak
Stages 4b, 9, 14 & 21, Roger Hassenforder
Stage 7 Tour de l'Ouest, Gérard Saint

1957
Stage 1 Vuelta a Andalucía, Miguel Bover
 UCI Cyclo-cross World Championship, Andrè Dufraisse
Paris Cyclo-cross, Andrè Dufraisse
Milano–Torino, Miguel Poblet
Stage 3a Vuelta a Levante, Federico Bahamontes
Stage 4 Paris–Nice, Nicolas Barone
Stage 6 Paris–Nice, Albert Platel
Milano–San Remo, Miguel Poblet
GP Martorell, Miguel Bover
Bonnat Criterium, Ferdinand Devèze
Stage 5 Tour de Champagne, Louis Bergaud
Mountains classification Vuelta a España, Federico Bahamontes
Stage 3, Federico Bahamontes
Stage 11, Gilbert Bauvin
Stages 6b, 7 & 8c Roma–Napoli–Roma, Miguel Poblet
Stage 1 Tour de Normandie, Jean Bourlès
Stage 2 Tour de Normandie, Pierre Everaert
 Overall Tour de Luxembourg, Gérard Saint
Stage 1, François Mahé
Stage 3, Gérard Saint
Stage 4, Nicolas Barone
Stage 8, Maurice Lampre
 Overall Circuit du Cher, Albert Dolhats
Stage 2, Albert Dolhats
Stage 1 Tour du Sud-Est, Raymond Plaza
GP du Midi-Libre, Jean-Pierre Schmitz
Mountains classification Giro d'Italia, Raphaël Géminiani
Stages 3, 9, 10 & 18, Miguel Poblet
Circuit des 4 Cantons, Albert Dolhats
Stage 6 Tour du Sud-Est, Ferdinand Devèze
 Overall Tour de l'Ariège, Gérard Saint
Stage 1, Maurice Lampre
Stages 2 & 3, Gérard Saint
Stage 2a Tour de Picardie, Albert Dolhats
Stage 6 Critérium du Dauphiné, Louis Bergaud
Stage 7 Critérium du Dauphiné, Michel Dejouhannet
Boucles de la Seine St Denis, Jacques Dupont
Omegna Criterium, Miguel Poblet
Stage 5a Tour de Suisse, Raphaël Géminiani
Loqueffret Criterium, Jean Bourlès
Stage 2 Circuit des Ardennes, Albert Platel
Stage 3a Tour de France, François Mahé
Stage 5 Tour de France, Gilbert Bauvin
Stage 16 Tour de France, Jean Bourlès
Florenville Criterium, Miguel Poblet
Saint-Just-sur-Loire Criterium, Roger Rivière
Nocturne de la Liberation, Raphaël Géminiani
Aniche Criterium, Pierre Everaert
Plounévez-Lochrist, Jean Bourlès
Montélimar Criterium, Louis Bergaud
Critérium Cycliste International de Quillan, Raphaël Géminiani
Taulé Criterium, Jean Bourlès
Stages 1a & 8 Volta a Catalunya, Miguel Poblet
Watten Criterium, Pierre Everaert
Stage 3 Circuit d'Aquitaine, Jean-Claude Annaert
Eymet Criterium, Albert Dolhats
World hour record, Roger Rivière

1958
 National Cyclo-cross Championship, Andrè Dufraisse
Stage 1 Giro di Sardegna, Raphaël Géminiani
 UCI Cyclo-cross World Championship, Andrè Dufraisse
Critérium International, Roger Hassenforder
Paris–Camembert, Nicolas Barone
 Overall Tour de l'Aude, Manuel Busto
Stage 2, Michel Dejouhannet
Stage 4, Manuel Busto
Overall Morlaix, Jean-Claude Annaert
Stage 5a Vuelta a España, François Mahé
La Charité-sur-Loire, Michel Dejouhannet
Bourg–Genève–Bourg, Manuel Busto
 Overall Tour de Romandie, Gilbert Bauvin
Stage 3b, Gilbert Bauvin
Stage 1 Tour du Sud-Est, Jean-Pierre Schmitz
Nantes Criterium, Albert Dolhats
Stage 5 Tour du Sud-Est, Brian Robinson
Stage 3b GP du Midi-Libre, Roger Hassenforder
Mountains classification Giro d'Italia, Jean Brankart
 National Track Championships, Individual Pursuit, Jean Brankart
Erembodegem–Terjoden, Pierre Machiels
 Overall Tour de Luxembourg, Jean-Pierre Schmitz
Stage 1, Jean-Claude Annaert
Stage 2, Jean-Pierre Schmitz
Stage 3 Tour de France, Gilbert Bauvin
GP du Brabant Wallon, Pierre Machiels
Stage 7 Tour de France, Brian Robinson
Circuit du Cher, Pierre Machiels
Stage 13 Tour de France, Louis Bergaud
Zolder Criterium, Pierre Machiels
GP de Fourmies, Pierre Machiels
Hoegaarden Criterium, Jean Brankart
 Overall Tour de la Loire, Pierre le Don
Namur Criterium, Jean Brankart
 Overall Tour de l'Ouest, Gilbert Scodeller
Stage 2, Pierre Everaert
Stage 5, Roger Hassenforder
Grote Geteprijs, Pierre Machiels
Manche-Océan, Joseph Morvan
Taulé Criterium, Gérard Saint
Stage 3a (TTT) Circuit d'Aquitaine, Raymond Mastrotto, Nicolas Barone & Gérard Thiélin
Stage 4 Circuit d'Aquitaine, Michel Dejouhannet
Montenaken Criterium, Pierre Machiels
Prix du Chasselas, Nicolas Barone
Trieste Criterium, Roger Rivière
 National Road Championships, Road Race, Jean-Pierre Schmitz

1959
Maz Cyclo-cross, Andrè Dufraisse
Nantes Cyclo-cross, Andrè Dufraisse
 National Cyclo-cross, Andrè Dufraisse
Saint-Claud Criterium, Roger Rivière
Paris–Camembert, Nicolas Barone
 Overall Vuelta a España, Antonio Suárez
Mountains classification, Antonio Suárez
Stage 1a (TTT), Roger Rivière, Pierre le Don, Jean Brankart, Raphaël Géminiani, Pierre Machiels, Roger Chaussabel, Gilbert Bauvin & Brian Robinson
Stage 5, Antonio Suárez
Stage 10 (TTT), Antonio Suárez, Roger Rivière, Pierre le Don, Jean Brankart, Raphaël Géminiani, Pierre Machiels, Roger Chaussabel, Gilbert Bauvin & Brian Robinson
Stages 14 & 16, Roger Rivière
Roubaix–Cassel–Roubaix, Jean-Claude Lefebvre
Argentan Criterium, Roger Rivière
Saint-Macaire-en-Mauges Criterium, Michel Dejouhannet
 Overall GP du Midi-Libre, Jean Brankart
Stage 3a, Jean Brankart
Merksem Road Race, Ab Geldermans
Stage 7a Critérium du Dauphiné, Roger Rivière
Stage 4 Tour de Champagne, François Mahé
 National Track Championships Individual Pursuit, Jean Brankart
 National Road Championships, Road Race, Antonio Suárez
Stages 6 & 22 Tour de France, Roger Rivière
Stage 7 Tour de France, Roger Hassenforder
Stage 8 Tour de France, Michel Dejouhannet
Stage 20 Tour de France, Brian Robinson
Florenville Criterium, Jean Brankart
 Overall Tour de l'Ouest, Joseph Morvan
Stages 4 & 5b, Tom Simpson
Bain-de-Bretagne Criterium, François Mahé
Wielsbeke Road Race, Ab Geldermans
Hamme Criterium, Jean Brankart
Haaltert Criterium, Norbert Coreelman
Charlieu Criterium, Roger Rivière
World hour record, Roger Rivière
Gooik Criterium, Pierre Machiels
Giussano Cyclo-cross, Andrè Dufraisse

1960
Stage 4 Paris–Nice, Michel Dejouhannet
Geldrop Criterium, Bas Maliepaard
Circuit du Cher, Joseph Morvan
 Overall Deutschland Tour, Ab Geldermans
Stage 2 Deutschland Tour, Ab Geldermans
Stage 4 Tour de Champagne, Gilbert Scodeller
Liège–Bastogne–Liège, Ab Geldermans
Breda Criterium, Bas Maliepaard
Stage 4 Critérium du Dauphiné, Luis Otaño
Stage 1a Driedaagse van Antwerpen, Luis Otaño
Stage 1b Driedaagse van Antwerpen, Bas Maliepaard, Ab Geldermans & Luis Otaño
Ferrière-la-Grande Criterium, Jean-Claude Annaert
Omloop der Zuid-West-Vlaamse Bergen, Romain Van Wynsberghe
Molenstede Criterium, Bas Maliepaard
GP Raf Jonckheere Criterium, Romain Van Wynsberghe
Bain-de-Bretagne Criterium, Michel Dejouhannet
 National Road Championships Road Race, Bas Maliepaard
Stage 3 Tour du Nord, Jean-Claude Annaert
Hennebont, Joseph Morvan
Zemst Cyclo-cross, Andrè Dufraisse

1961
Eizer-Overijse Cyclo-cross, Andrè Dufraisse
 National Cyclo-cross, Andrè Dufraisse
Oudergem Cyclo-cross, Andrè Dufraisse
Stage 1 Menton–Roma, Ab Geldermans
Stage 4b Menton–Roma, Ab Geldermans
Paris–Camembert, Jean-Claude Annaert
Stage 2b Roma–Napoli–Roma, Jo De Haan
Stage 10 Vuelta a España, Luis Otaño
 Overall Quatre Jours de Dunkerque, Ab Geldermans
Stage 1b (TTT) Jo De Haan & Bas Maliepaard
Stage 4 Tour de l'Aude, Raymond Elena
Helmond Criterium, Jo De Haan
Stage 3 GP du Midi-Libre, Jean-Claude Annaert
Stage 5 Tour de France, Louis Bergaud
Stage 10 Tour de France, Guy Ignolin
Nouan-le-Fuzelier Criterium, Bas Maliepaard
 National Road Championships Road Race, Bas Maliepaard
Wuustwezel Criterium, Bas Maliepaard

1962
 National Cyclo-cross, Andrè Dufraisse
Stage 1 Paris–Nice, Jean Graczyk
Stage 6 Paris–Nice, Rudi Altig
Stage 3 Tour du Var, Jacques Anquetil
Stages 2 & 3 Deutschland Tour, Rudi Altig
Denderhoutem Criterium, Jo de Roo
 Overall Vuelta a España, Rudi Altig
 Points classification, Rudi Altig
Stages 2, 7 & 15, Rudi Altig
Stage 4, Seamus Elliott
Stage 5 (TTT), Seamus Elliott, Michel Stolker, Jean-Claude Annaert, Marcel Queheille, Marcel Janssens, Jean Graczyk, Rudi Altig, Jacques Anquetil, Jean Stablinski, Ab Geldermans
Stage 6, 13, 14 & 16, Jean Graczyk
Stage 8, Jean-Claude Annaert
Stage 10, Ab Geldermans
Stage 11, Jean Stablinski
 Overall GP du Midi-Libre, Michel Stolker
Stage 1, Michel Stolker
Stage 2b, Jo de Roo
 National Track Championships, Individual Pursuit, Robert Varnajo
Stage 1 Tour de l'Aude, Jo de Roo
Stage 4 Tour de l'Aude, Ab Geldermans
Bordeaux–Paris, Jo de Roo
Labastide-d'Armagnac Criterium, Seamus Elliott
 National Road Championships, Road Race, Jean Stablinski
Manx Premier Trophy, Rudi Altig
Sallanches Criterium, Jean Stablinski
Stage 11 Tour de l'Avenir, René Binggeli
 Overall Tour de France, Jacques Anquetil
 Points classification, Rudi Altig
Stages 1 3 17, Rudi Altig
Stages 8b & 20, Jacques Anquetil
Stage 14, Jean Stablinski
 National Road Championships, Road Race, Ab Geldermans
Prix Martini, Seamus Elliott
Montélimar Criterium, Rudi Altig
Drie Zustersteden, Jean Stablinski
UCI World Championship, Road, Profs, Jean Stablinski
Boucles de l'Aulne, Jacques Anquetil
Stage 4 Circuit d'Aquitaine, Marcel Queheille
Paris–Tours, Jo de Roo
Nantes Criterium, Jean Stablinski
Giro di Lombardia, Jo de Roo
Pernod – Super Prestige, Jo de Roo
Trofeo Baracchi, Rudi Altig & Jacques Anquetil
Soings Criterium, Jean Graczyk

1963
Eizer-Overijse, Cyclo-cross, Maurice Gandolfo
 National Cyclo-cross, Andrè Dufraisse
Genova–Nice, Rudi Altig
Stage 2 Vuelta a Levante, Pierre Everaert
 Overall Paris–Nice, Jacques Anquetil
Stage 2 & 5, Rudi Altig
Stage 6a, Jacques Anquetil
 Overall Critérium International, Jacques Anquetil
Stage 2, Jacques Anquetil
Stage 2 Tour du Var, Jacques Anquetil
Guénin Criterium, Guy Ignolin
Paris–Camembert, Jacques Simon
 Overall Tour du Sud-Est, Jean-Claude Lebaube
Paris–Brussel, Jean Stablinski
 Overall Vuelta a España, Jacques Anquetil
 Points classification, Bas Maliepaard
Stage 1b, Jacques Anquetil
Stage 5, Bas Maliepaard
Stage 6, Guy Ignolin
Stage 10, Jean Stablinski
Stage 13, Seamus Elliott
Stage 15, Guy Ignolin
Stage 4b GP du Midi-Libre, Ab Geldermans
Labastide-d'Armagnac Criterium, Rudi Altig
Montmorillon Criterium, Fernand Delort
 Overall Critérium du Dauphiné, Jacques Anquetil
Stage 1, Pierre Everaert
Stage 4, Jean Stablinski
Stage 6a, Jacques Anquetil
 National Track Championships, Individual Pursuit, Robert Varnajo
 National Road Championships, Road Race, Jean Stablinski
 Overall Tour de France, Jacques Anquetil
Stage 3, Seamus Elliott
Stages 6b, 10, 17 & 19, Jacques Anquetil
Stage 11 & 14, Guy Ignolin
Chaumont Criterium, Jean Stablinski
Oradour-sur-Glane Criterium, Jacques Anquetil
 Overall Paris–Luxembourg, Rudi Altig
Stage 1, Rudi Altig
Château-Chinon Criterium, Jacques Anquetil
Bain-de-Bretagne Criterium, Guy Ignolin
Mijl van Mares, Bas Maliepaard
Circuit d'Auvergne, Jacques Anquetil
Critérium cycliste international de Quillan, Jacques Anquetil
Bussières Criterium, Jacques Anquetil
Manche-Océan, Ab Geldermans
Vayrac Criterium, Seamus Elliott
Paris–Tours, Jo de Roo
Giro di Lombardia, Jo de Roo
Pernod–Super Prestige, Jacques Anquetil

1964
Mazé Cyclo-cross, Andrè Dufraisse 
 Overall Vuelta a Andalucía, Rudi Altig
Stages 3 & 4, Rudi Altig
Stage 6, Arie den Hartog
Stage 7, Michel Stolker
Stage 6b Paris–Nice, Anatole Novak
Brugge Road Race, Cees Lute
Stage 8b Paris–Nice, Rudi Altig
Gent–Wevelgem, Jacques Anquetil
Oldenzaal Critérium, Arie den Hartog
Stage 1 Critérium International, Jacques Anquetil
Paris–Camembert, Arie den Hartog
Tour of Flanders, Rudi Altig
GP Union Dortmund, Rudi Altig
 Overall Tour du Sud-Est, Jean-Claude Annaert
Stage 2 Tour of Belgium, Rudi Altig
Stage 1 Euskal Bizikleta, Arie den Hartog
GP de Vougy, Robert Ducard
Circuit d'Auvergne, Louis Rostollan
Stage 8 Vuelta a España, Michel Stolker
Stage 4 Quatre Jours de Dunkerque, Bas Maliepaard
Stage 4b GP du Midi-Libre, Jo de Roo
Stage 1 Critérium du Dauphiné, Jean-Claude Lebaube
 Overall Giro d'Italia, Jacques Anquetil
Stage 5, Jacques Anquetil
Stage 19, Cees Lute
Stage 22, Willi Altig
 National Track Championships, Individual Pursuit, Robert Varnajo
 Overall Tour de Luxembourg, Arie den Hartog
Stage 2a, Cees Lute, Bas Maliepaard & Arie den Hartog
Stage 3, Arie den Hartog
Manx Premier Trophy, Seamus Elliott
 Overall Tour de France, Jacques Anquetil
Stage 4, Rudi Altig
Stage 9, 10b, 17 & 22b, Jacques Anquetil
Stage 12, Jo de Roo
Stage 21, Jean Stablinski
Bain-de-Bretagne Critérium, Jacques Anquetil
Grote Kermiskoers, Cees Lute
 National Road Championships, Road Race, Jo de Roo
 Overall Circuit du Morbihan, Seamus Elliott
GP de Belgique, Arie den Hartog
 National Road Championships, Road Race, Rudi Altig
 National Road Championships, Road Race, Jean Stablinski
Castillon-la-Bataille, Criterium, Jacques Anquetil
Manche-Océan, Jean-Claude Lebaube
GP Plouay, Jean Bourlès
Zuidland Criterium, Arie den Hartog
 National Track Championships, Madison, Rudi Altig
GP du Parisien, Arie den Hartog, Ab Geldermans & Rudi Altig
Circuit des Frontières, Jean Stablinski
Frankfurt am Main Six Days, Rudi Altig

References

Further reading

External links

Defunct cycling teams based in France
1954 establishments in France
1964 disestablishments in France
Cycling teams established in 1954
Cycling teams disestablished in 1964